Schuyler's Monster: A Father's Journey with His Wordless Daughter is a book by Robert Rummel-Hudson. Rummel-Hudson began writing online in 1995 and also writes a parenting blog called Fighting Monsters with Rubber Swords; both book and blog concern the author's and his wife's parenting of their daughter who was born with polymicrogyria, a brain disorder that made her unable to speak.

Commentary on Rummel-Hudson's writings have been featured on NPR's "Weekend America" and in the Austin Chronicle, the Irish Times, the New Haven Register, the Dallas Morning News, Wondertime Magazine, and Good Housekeeping.

External links
 Official Website
Fighting Monsters with Rubber Swords

References

2009 non-fiction books
Writers of blogs about home and family